Good cop/bad cop is a psychological tactic often used by police for interrogation.

Good cop bad cop may also refer to:

Film and TV
 Bon Cop, Bad Cop, a 2006 Canadian dark comedy-thriller buddy cop film
 Good Cop, Bad Cop (film), a 1994 American action thriller film
 "Bad Cop/Good Cop", a character voiced by Liam Neeson in The Lego Movie
 Good Cop Bad Cop Productions, American production company notably behind Live from Daryl's House

Music
 "Good Cop Bad Cop", a song by Everything but the Girl from their 1996 album Walking Wounded
 "Good Cop/Bad Cop", a song by Blahzay Blahzay from the 1996 album Blah Blah Blah (Blahzay Blahzay album)
 "Good Cop Bad Cop", a song by the Poster Children from their 1999 album New World Record
 "Good Cop, Bad Cop (song)", a 2017 song by Ice Cube
 "Good Cop Bad Cop”, a song by Psychic Lemon from their eponymous 2018 debut album
 Bad Cop/Bad Cop, California punk rock band

See also 
 Good Cop, a 2012 British police procedural television series
 The Good Cop, a 2017 Netflix television series